Hisham Melhem ( Hišām Melḥem) is a Lebanese-American journalist, who serves currently as Washington bureau chief of Al Arabiya News Channel and correspondent for An-Nahar newspaper.

Biography

Background
Melhem studied philosophy at Villanova University, and after graduating in 1976 with his B.A., spent three years working on a doctorate in philosophy at Georgetown University.

Career
Melhem has reported for Radio Monte Carlo and Al-Qabas and An-Nahar newspapers and has served as Washington bureau chief for As-Safir newspaper.

He has also been the Washington bureau chief for Al Arabiya, and hosted their U.S.-Arab relations program, Across the Ocean, for four years.

He writes for others publications, appears on news programs, and speaks publicly.  He is an expert for the Woodrow Wilson International Center for Scholars He has appeared as a news commentator about Middle Eastern and other foreign policy areas on PBS NewsHour for nearly two decades.

Interviews
On January 26, 2009, Al Arabiya News Network was given the first official interview with the newly inaugurated President Barack Obama:  Melhem conducted the interview.

Major interviews to date include:
 President George W. Bush
 Secretary of State Colin Powell
 Deputy Secretary of State Richard Armitage
 Secretary of State Condoleezza Rice
 Secretary of Defense Robert Gates 
 Chairman of the Joint Chiefs of Staff Admiral Mike Mullen
 President Barack Obama
 Secretary of State Hillary Clinton

Writings
 Dual Containment:  The Demise of a Fallacy (1997)

References

External links 
 The Barbarians Within Our Gates Politico Magazine, 18 September 2014
Hisham Melhem on The Lead with Jake Tapper, CNN 2 September 2013
Post-Arab Spring, Hisham Melhem fears 'Arab civilization has collapsed' The Current, CBC Radio, 30 September 2014

Year of birth missing (living people)
Living people
Lebanese journalists
Villanova University alumni
Georgetown University alumni